A Midsummer Night's Dream is a 1999 romantic comedy fantasy film based on the play of the same name by William Shakespeare. It was written, directed and co-produced by Michael Hoffman. The ensemble cast features Kevin Kline as Bottom, Michelle Pfeiffer and Rupert Everett as Titania and Oberon, Stanley Tucci as Puck, and Calista Flockhart, Anna Friel, Christian Bale, and Dominic West as the four lovers.

Plot of the play 
In 1890s Monte Athena, in the Kingdom of Italy, young lovers Lysander and Hermia are forbidden to marry by her father Egeus, who has promised Hermia to Demetrius. Lysander and Hermia make plans to flee to the forest to escape the arrangement. Demetrius follows them, having been made aware of the plan by Helena, a young woman who is desperately in love with him. Once in the forest, they wander into the fairy world, ruled by Oberon and Titania, King and Queen of the fairies. Oberon and his servant sprite Puck cause mayhem among the lovers with a magic potion that causes both Lysander and Demetrius to fall in love with Helena, leading to a rift between all four that culminates (famously in this adaptation) in a mud-wrestling scene. Oberon then bewitches Titania with the same potion.

Meanwhile, an acting troupe prepares a play for the entertainment of the Duke. The leader of the actors and the actors, including a weaver named Bottom, and Francis Flute take their rehearsal to the forest. The mischievous Puck magically enchants Bottom with the head of an ass and Bottom is then seen by the bewitched Titania. Titania woos Bottom in her bower, attended by fairies. Oberon tires of the sport and puts all to rights, pairing Lysander back with Hermia and Demetrius with Helena, and reconciling with his own queen, Titania.

In the final part, Bottom and his troupe of "rude Mechanicals" perform their amateur play, based on the tragedy of Pyramus and Thisbe, before Duke Theseus, his wife Hippolyta, and the court, unintentionally producing a tragedy that turns to be a comedy.

Cast of main characters

Production 
A Midsummer Night's Dream was filmed on location in Lazio and Tuscany, and at Cinecittà Studios, Rome, Italy. The action of the play was transported from Athens, Greece, to a fictional Monte Athena, located in the Tuscan region of Italy, although all textual mentions of Athens were retained.

The film made use of Felix Mendelssohn's incidental music for an 1843 stage production (including the famous Wedding March), alongside operatic works from Giuseppe Verdi, Gaetano Donizetti, Vincenzo Bellini, Gioacchino Rossini and Pietro Mascagni.

Home media
The film was released on VHS and DVD on November 30, 1999.

Critical reception 

A Midsummer Night's Dream holds a rating of 67% on Rotten Tomatoes as of September 2019, and a score of 61 on Metacritic, indicating generally favorable reviews. Many critics singled out Kevin Kline and Stanley Tucci for particular praise.

In The New York Times, Janet Maslin wrote:

In the Chicago Sun-Times, Roger Ebert wrote:

In the San Francisco Chronicle, Peter Stack wrote:

In Time Out New York, Andrew Johnston wrote:
{{blockquote|A strangely uneven adaptation of the Bard's most famous comedy, Michael Hoffman's Dream is, if nothing else, admirable for its lack of a contrived gimmick. Yes, the story has been transplanted to Tuscany in the 1890s, and the cast is packed with big names, but Hoffman rightly treats the text as the real star of the show. The film soars when actors who remember that Shakespeare was primarily an entertainer carry the ball, but things get pretty turgid when the focus is on those who seem cowed by appearing in an adaptation of a Major Literary Classic.<ref>Time Out New York, May 13–19, 1999, p. 100.</ref>}}

In The Washington Post, Jane Horwitz wrote:

Also in the Washington Post, Desson Howe wrote:

In Variety, Emanuel Levy described the film as a "whimsical, intermittently enjoyable but decidedly unmagical version of the playwright's wild romantic comedy ... There is not much chemistry between Pfeiffer and Everett, nor between Pfeiffer and Kline, particularly in their big love scene. Kline overacts physically and emotionally, Flockhart is entertaining in a broad manner, and Pfeiffer renders a strenuously theatrical performance. Overall, the Brits give more coherent and resonant performances, especially Friel and West as the romantic couple, a restrained Everett as Oberon, and Rees as the theatrical manager."Time Out wrote that "this Dream'' is middlebrow and unashamed of it. Injecting the film with fun and pathos, Kline makes a superb Bottom; it's his play and he acts it to the hilt."

See also 
 List of William Shakespeare screen adaptations

References 
Notes

Further reading

External links 
 
 
 
 
 

1999 films
1999 fantasy films
1999 multilingual films
1999 romantic comedy films
1990s American films
1990s British films
1990s fantasy comedy films
1990s English-language films
1990s Italian films
1990s Italian-language films
1990s romantic fantasy films
American fantasy comedy films
American multilingual films
American romantic comedy films
American romantic fantasy films
British fantasy comedy films
British multilingual films
British romantic comedy films
British romantic fantasy films
English-language Italian films
Films about fairies and sprites
Films based on A Midsummer Night's Dream
Films directed by Michael Hoffman
Films scored by Simon Boswell
Films set in the 1890s
Films set in Italy
Films shot at Cinecittà Studios
Films shot in Tuscany
Fox Searchlight Pictures films
Italian fantasy comedy films
Italian multilingual films
Italian romantic comedy films
Italian-language American films
Regency Enterprises films